A.A.C. Eagles is an American soccer team based in Chicago, Illinois, United States. Founded in 1940, the team plays in Region II of the United States Adult Soccer Association, a network of amateur leagues at the fifth tier of the American Soccer Pyramid. They joined the United Premier Soccer League in 2022.

The team's colors are red and white.

History
The Eagles were formed as an ethnic club by Polish American immigrants to the Chicago area in 1940. Originally known as the Polish American Athletic Club Eagles (PAAC Eagles), the team first played in the National Soccer League of Chicago, and played under that name until 1950, when the team became officially known as the Chicago Eagles. Since then the team has been known by various names, swapping between its earlier names (PAAC Eagles, Chicago Eagles), and newer variants (Chicago American Eagles, Polish Eagles), before settling on its current incarnation in the mid-1990s. The Eagles currently play in the Metropolitan Soccer League, which is a member of the United States Adult Soccer Association Region II group of leagues.

The Eagles have a long and distinguished history of competing in the National Challenge Cup. Having already reached the final stages of the competition during its early years in 1948 and 1949, the Eagles reached the semi-finals in 1989, losing on penalties to eventual winners St. Petersburg Kickers, and won the tournament in 1990 in the pre-MLS era, beating the Brooklyn Italians 2–0 in the final thanks to goals from Janusz Kieca and Peter Modrzejewski. Their win in the competition also gave them entry to the 1991 CONCACAF Champions' Cup, where they lost 4–1 on aggregate in the first round to Bermudian club PHC Zebras.

The Eagles qualified for the cup again in 1994, the last all-amateur competition prior to the entrance of teams from Major League Soccer, but lost 2–1 to Bavarian Leinenkugel in the quarter finals. Since the introduction of professional teams into the cup the Eagles have not fared as well. They lost in the first round to the Chicago Stingers in 1995, lost in the first round again in 2002 to New York Freedom, and lost in the first round for a third time in 2005, this time falling 4–1 to USL Premier Development League side Chicago Fire Premier.

In 2008 the club qualified for their fourth modern US Open Cup, beating the Milwaukee Bavarians and Des Moines Menace Reserves in their regional qualification tournament, but lost 4–0 in the first round to the Pittsburgh Riverhounds of the USL Second Division.

In addition to their USOC triumph in 1990, the Eagles won the USASA Open Cup in 1989 and 2002. They are nine-time Illinois state champions, eleven-time Metropolitan Soccer League Major Division champions, and also sponsored the Chicago Eagles Select which briefly played in the USL Premier Development League in 2001 and 2002.

In 2022 Eagles announced via social media their joining the United Premier Soccer League.

Players

Current roster

Source:

Year-by-year

Honors
U.S. Open Cup Winner (1): 1990
National Amateur Cup Winner (1): 1989
Peel Cup Winner (7): 1950, 1954, 1955, 1957, 1963, 1999, 2000
Participations in CONCACAF Champions' Cup: 1991

Head coaches
  Pawel Otachel (present)

References

External links
 Official website
 Meet the USASA: AAC Eagles

Soccer clubs in Illinois
Soccer clubs in Chicago
National Soccer League (Chicago) teams
1940 establishments in Illinois
Polish-American organizations
Polish association football clubs outside Poland
Association football clubs established in 1940
Indoor soccer clubs in the United States
U.S. clubs in CONCACAF Champions' Cup
U.S. Open Cup winners